MP4 is MPEG-4 Part 14, a file format.

MP4 may also refer to:

 Møller–Plesset perturbation theory of the fourth order in computational chemistry
 Mario Party 4, a 2002 video game for GameCube
 Metroid Prime 4, an upcoming video game for Nintendo Switch
 MP4 (band), a band made up of UK Members of Parliament
 Mammal Paleogene zone 4, a division of the Paleogene period 
 McLaren MP4/1, the McLaren team's Formula One car
 MP4, a 2000 album by Michael Penn

See also
 MP4 player, a marketing name for certain portable media players